Doris J. Schattschneider (née Wood) is an American mathematician, a retired professor of mathematics at Moravian College. She is known for writing about tessellations and about the art of M. C. Escher, for helping Martin Gardner validate and popularize the pentagon tiling discoveries of amateur mathematician Marjorie Rice, and for co-directing with Eugene Klotz the project that developed The Geometer's Sketchpad.

Biography
Schattschneider was born in Staten Island; her mother, Charlotte Lucile Ingalls Wood, taught Latin and was herself the daughter of a Staten Island school principal, and her father, Robert W. Wood, Jr., was an electrical engineer who worked for the New York City Bureau of Bridge Design. Her family moved to Lake Placid, New York during World War II, while her father served as an engineer for the U. S. Army; she began her schooling in Lake Placid, but returned to Staten Island after the war. She did her undergraduate studies in mathematics at the University of Rochester, and earned a Ph.D. in 1966 from Yale University under the joint supervision of Tsuneo Tamagawa and Ichirô Satake; her thesis, in abstract algebra, concerned semisimple algebraic groups. She taught at Northwestern University for a year and at the University of Illinois at Chicago Circle for three years before joining the faculty of Moravian College in 1968, where she remained for 34 years until her retirement. She was the first female editor of Mathematics Magazine, from 1981 to 1985. 

She was married for 54 years to the Rev. Dr. David A. Schattschneider (1939-2016), a church historian and Dean of Moravian Theological Seminary; their daughter Laura Ellen Schattschneider is a lawyer.

Involvement with Marjorie Rice
By February 1976, Marjorie Rice had discovered a new pentagon type and its variations in shape and drew up several tessellations by these pentagon tiles. She mailed her discoveries to Martin Gardner using her own home-made notation. He, in turn, sent Rice's work to Schattschneider, who was an expert in tiling patterns. Schattschneider was skeptical at first, saying that Rice's peculiar notation system seemed odd, like "hieroglyphics". But with careful examination, she was able to validate Rice's results.

Schattschneider not only helped Martin Gardner popularize the pentagon tiling discoveries of Rice, but lauded her work as an exciting discovery by an amateur mathematician.

In 1995, at a regional meeting of the Mathematical Association of America held in Los Angeles, Schattschneider convinced Rice and her husband to attend her lecture on Rice's work. Before concluding her talk, Schattschneider introduced the amateur mathematician who had advanced the study of tessellation. "And everybody in the room . . . gave her a standing ovation."

Awards and honors
Schattschneider won the Mathematical Association of America's Carl B. Allendoerfer Award for excellence in expository writing in Mathematics Magazine in 1979, for her article "Tiling the plane with congruent pentagons". In 1993, she won the MAA's Award for Distinguished Teaching of College or University Mathematics. In 2012 she became a fellow of the American Mathematical Society. She delivered the Martin Gardner Lecture at MathFest in August 2021.

Selected publications
Books
M. C. Escher Kaleidocycles (with Wallace Walker), Ballantine Books, 1977, Pomegranate Artbooks and TACO, 1987, Taschen 2015
Visions of Symmetry: Notebooks, Periodic Drawings, and Related Work of M. C. Escher (W. H. Freeman, 1990, 1992; 
Revised as M. C. Escher: Visions of Symmetry, Harry N. Abrams, 2004)
A Companion to Calculus (with Dennis Ebersole, Alicia Sevilla, and Kay Somers, Brooks/Cole, 1995)

Edited volumes
Geometry Turned On!: Dynamic Software in Learning, Teaching, and Research (with James King, Cambridge University Press, 1997)
M.C. Escher's Legacy: A Centennial Celebration (with Michelle Emmer, Springer, 2003)

Articles
; 
Reprinted with Afterword in The Harmony of the World: 75 Years of Mathematics Magazine, eds. G. Alexanderson and P. Ross, Math. Assoc. of Amer., Washington DC, 2007, pp. 175-190.
.
;
Reprinted as Mathematical Recreations:  A Collection in Honor of Martin Gardner, Dover Publications, New York, 1998.
 Schattschneider, Doris (1998), "One Corona is Enough for the Euclidean Plane," coauthor Nikolai Dolbilin.  In Quasicrystals and Discrete Geometry (J. Patera, editor).  Fields Institute Monographs, Vol. 10, AMS, Providence, RI, 1998, pp. 207–246.
 Accompanying web site:  Catalog of Isohedral Tilings by Symmetric Polygonal Tiles

References

Further reading
.

1939 births
Living people
20th-century American mathematicians
21st-century American mathematicians
American women mathematicians
Mathematics popularizers
University of Rochester alumni
Yale University alumni
Moravian University faculty
Fellows of the American Mathematical Society
People from Staten Island
20th-century women mathematicians
21st-century women mathematicians
Mathematicians from New York (state)
20th-century American women
21st-century American women